The Council on Undergraduate Research (CUR) is a membership organization founded in 1987 that supports the activity of undergraduate research. It sponsors various activities and events at campuses around the US to enhance the undergraduate research capacity of both faculty and students. Its office, staffed by an executive director and support staff, is in Washington, DC.

History 
In 1987, the Research Corporation, particularly Brian Andreen, facilitated the establishment of a group of twelve research-active chemists from primarily undergraduate institutions to support and develop undergraduate research. This group expanded and added councils in physics and astronomy, biology, geology, psychology, and other areas. The all-volunteer organization nominated and elected new councilors as those serving stepped down until 1990, when CUR voted to open itself to membership like most scientific organizations. Currently it has both individual and institutional memberships.

CUR has meetings periodically to decide on directions and activities. In addition to membership meetings, CUR has dialogues with the major governmental funding agencies in the Washington DC area, workshops on how to set up and successfully run an undergraduate research program at a college or university, undergraduate research presentations (posters on Capitol Hill and a large national conference of students held after CUR merged with NCUR), and other topics. It has published directories of undergraduate research in chemistry, biology, physics, geology, psychology, and other fields as well as books advocating and explaining undergraduate research. It publishes two journals, CUR Quarterly and Scholarship and Practice of Undergraduate Research.

Merger 
In 2010, CUR and the National Conference on Undergraduate Research (NCUR) merged their two organizations to form one, with CUR as the umbrella organization presenting a National Conference on Undergraduate Research (NCUR) annually.

Events and activities
The Council on Undergraduate Research offers NCUR annually and also offers posters on Capitol Hill, dialogues with NIH and NSF, a business meeting, a one-day conference for faculty mentors, and workshops on ways to develop undergraduate research programs. CUR also runs a consulting service and a program review service. CUR presents several awards including CUR Fellows for both faculty members and students. It has a speakers bureau and a registry of undergraduate researchers.

The Council on Undergraduate Research Quarterly contributes to the growth and development of undergraduate research endeavors across colleges and universities by highlighting best practices, models for mentoring, and the assessment of undergraduate research. The goal of the journal is to provide useful and inspiring information about student-faculty collaborative research and scholarship from all disciplines at all types of institutions in the United States and abroad.

Leadership
Presidents of the Council: 

 Michael P. Doyle 1979-1983, 1987-1989
 Jerry Mohrig 1983-1987
 Stuart Crampton 1989-1991
 Laura Hoopes 1991-1992
 Thomas Goodwin 1992-1993
 John Mateja 1993-1994
 Mary Allen 1994-1995
 Royce Engstrom 1995-1996
 Thomas Wenzel 1996-1997
Neal Abraham 1997-1998
 Charlotte Otto 1998-1999
 David Elmes 1999-2000
 Toufic Hakim 2000-2001
 Michael Nelson 2001-2002
 Mitchell Malachowski 2002-2003
 Jill Singer 2003-2004
 Tim Elgren 2004-2005
 Mike Tannenbaum 2005-2006
 Lori Bettison-Varga 2006-2007
 Kerry Karukstis 2007-2008
 Jeffrey Osborn 2008-2009
 Diane Husic 2009-2010
 Elizabeth Paul 2010-2011
 Bill Campbell 2011-2012
 Mary Crowe 2012-2013
 Julio Rivera 2013-2014
 Ami Ahern-Rindell 2014-2015
 Roger Rowlett 2015-2016
 Susan Larson 2016-2017
 Anne Boettcher 2017-2018
 Iain Crawford 2018-2019
 Janice DeCosmo, 2019-2020
 Silvia Ronco, 2020-2021
 Jeanne Mekolichick, 2021-2022
 Ruth Palmer, 2022-2023

References 

1987 establishments in the United States
Organizations established in 1987
Organizations based in Washington, D.C.
Research organizations in the United States
Undergraduate education in the United States